Terminal Commerce Building, also known as the North American Building, is a historic building complex located in the Callowhill neighborhood of Philadelphia, Pennsylvania.  It was built between 1929 and 1931 by the Reading Company, and is a combined office, showroom, parking garage, warehouse and freight station totaling over 1.3 million square feet.  It measures 528 feet by 225 feet.  The front section houses offices, and is a 14-story, reinforced concrete, brick and terra cotta faced building in the Art Deco style.  The front facade has a central tower with terra cotta ornamentation that houses water tanks.  The rear warehouse section is 12-stories and is "H"-shaped.

It was added to the National Register of Historic Places in 1996. It is a contributing property to the Callowhill Industrial Historic District.

Today, the building serves as one of the largest interconnection and colocation facilities on the east coast of the United States with 11 stories and 1.3 million square feet of space. The property was acquired by Netrality Properties in March 2014, and is considered the most fiber-dense, network neutral facility between New York and Virginia.

References

External links 

 Netrality Properties, Philadelphia

Industrial buildings and structures on the National Register of Historic Places in Philadelphia
Art Deco architecture in Pennsylvania
Industrial buildings completed in 1931
Historic district contributing properties in Pennsylvania
Callowhill, Philadelphia
Reading Company